The Irish Squadron  originally  known as the Irish Fleet  was a series of temporary naval formations assembled for specific military campaigns of the English Navy, the Navy Royal and later the Royal Navy from 1297 to 1731.

History
From the 13th to 17th centuries, the Irish Squadron was a temporary formation assembled for specific naval campaigns, commanded by a senior officer whose title changed a number of times. It was one of four separate fleets, the other three being the Western, Northern and Aquitaine, each with their own independent commander, until 1406 when they came under the unified command of the High Admiral of England, Ireland and Aquitaine. For most of its existence, the Irish Squadron conducted operations from Milford Haven in Wales, before switching to Greenock, Scotland during the 1680s.

In 1298, Edward I of England appointed Sir William de Leybourne as the first "Admiral of the Irish Sea", responsible for all English ships operating in that area. During the 14th century, the squadron was formed on four occasions, first in 1356 during the reign of Edward III of England to protect troop convoys against Scottish privateers. The other three occasions were in support of expeditions against Ireland ordered by Richard II of England; in 1382 under Sir William Spalding, 1397 under John Beaufort, 1st Earl of Somerset and from January to September 1399 under Thomas Percy, 1st Earl of Worcester.

During the Tudor period, the squadron was re-established for service in the 1539 to 1545 Anglo-Scottish Wars and again during the 1569 to 1583 Desmond Rebellions led by Sir William Wynter, who was ordered to cut off all sea routes into Ireland and seize all ships of the pending papal invasion force. At the start of the First English Civil War in 1642, most of the navy was controlled by Parliament and until 1653 it was known as the "Irish Guard Naval Squadron of Parliament", playing a significant role in the 1649 to 1651 Cromwellian conquest of Ireland. Its strength varied but reached a peak of 56 ships in 1645, making it the second-largest squadron in the navy. 

During the Nine Years' War, the squadron fought at the Battle of Bantry Bay in May 1689 under the command of George Rooke who retained his position until early 1690. In June 1690, it took part in the Capture of Waterford led by Rear-Admiral Cloudesley Shovell and in 1691 was part of a larger naval force assembled to transfer King William III to Ireland. Reformed in July 1727 and in July 1731, it was gradually reduced in numbers before being disbanded. During the French Revolutionary Wars in 1797, the Royal Navy finally established a permanent naval formation for the Irish Sea known as the Coast of Ireland Station, based in Cork with repair and resupply bases at Kinsale Dockyard.

In command
Note:Incomplete list of post holders include.

Squadron composition
The Irish Squadron as 1 September 1689.

Footnote

Bibliography
 Clark, New Jersey, USA: The Lawbook Exchange, Ltd. .
 Clowes, Sir William Laird (1897). The Royal Navy, a History from the Earliest Times to the Present (I ed.). London: Sampson Low Marston and Company.
 Corbett, Julian Stafford (1917). "The Navy of Elizabeth". Drake and the Tudor navy, with a history of the rise of England as a maritime power. London, England: London : Longmans, Green. 
 Davies, J. D. (2008). "Convoys, Cruisers and Station Ships". Pepys Navy, Ships, Men and Warfare 1649 to 1689. Barnsley, England: Seaforth Publishing. 
 Fortescue, Sir John; Plummer, Charles (1999). The Governance of England, Otherwise Called, The Difference Between an Absolute and a Limited Monarchy.
 Godolphin, John (1661). Synēgoros thalassios, A view of the admiral jurisdiction wherein the most material points concerning that jurisdiction are fairly and submissively discussed : as also divers of the laws, customes, rights, and privileges of the high admiralty of England by ancient records, and other arguments of law asserted: whereunto is added by way of appendix an extract of the ancient laws of Oleron / by John Godolphin ... University of Michigan, An Arbour, MI, USA: W. Godbid for Edmund Paxton and John Sherley.  
 Harris, Sir Nicholas. (1847). A History of the Royal Navy: 1327-1422. London: R. Bentley
 Joyce, Patrick Weston (1910). "The Geraldine Rebellion - Concise History of Ireland". www.libraryireland.com. National Library of Ireland. 
 KEYMER, E. W.L.; REED, ADRIAN; GRAINGER, J. D.; WELCH, JOHN C.; LEE, C. D.; OWEN, HUGH (January 1996). "NOTES:Richard Swanley (c 1592-1650), Admiral of the Fleet on the Irish Coast". The Mariner's Mirror. 82 (4): 461–476. doi:10.1080/00253359.1996.10656619.
 Laughton, John Knox. "Swanley Richard". Dictionary of National Biography, 1885-1900. Dictionary of National Biography, 1885-1900, Volume 55. 
 Le Fevre, Peter (January 1982). "SIR GEORGE AYSCUE, COMMONWEALTH AND RESTORATION ADMIRAL". The Mariner's Mirror. 68 (2): 189–202. doi:10.1080/00253359.1982.10655858.
 Lenihan, Pádraig (2000). Conquest and Resistance: War in Seventeenth-Century Ireland. Leiden, Netherlands: Brill Publishing. .
 Lundy, Darryl (19 September 2018). "Person Page: James Butler, 9th Earl of Ormonde". www.thepeerage.com. The Peerage. Retrieved 21 September 2018.
 Manganiello, Stephen C. (2004). "Appendix: The Navy". The Concise Encyclopedia of the Revolutions and Wars of England, Scotland, and Ireland, 1639-1660. Scarecrow Press. .
 Meredith, Jon (2009). "THE ENGLISH NAVY IN AN IRISH WAR: CAPTAIN GEORGE ROOKE'S SQUADRON AND THE JACOBITE WAR IN IRELAND, SUMMER 1689". The Mariner's Mirror. 95 (2): 179–193. doi:10.1080/00253359.2009.10657095.
 Michael K. Jones and Malcolm G. Underwood, The King's Mother: Lady Margaret Beaufort, Countess of Richmond and Derby', 23.
 Murphy, Elaine (2012). Ireland and the War at Sea, 1641-1653. Woodbridge, England: Boydell & Brewer Ltd. .
 Rodger, N.A.M. (2006). "Appendix III: Fleets". The command of the ocean: a naval history of Britain 1649-1815 (1st ed.). London, England: Penguin. .
 Rodger, N.A.M. (1997). "Appendix V Admirals and Officials". The safeguard of the sea: a naval history of Britain. Vol 1., 660-1649. London, England: Penguin. .
 Townsend, George Henry (1877). The Manual of Dates: A Dictionary of Reference to All the Most Important Events in the History of Mankind to be Found in Authentic Records. London, England: Frederick Warne.
 Yonge, Charles Duke (1863). The History of the British Navy: From the Earliest Period to the Present Time. London, England: Richard Bentley.

Military history of the Irish Sea
Naval units and formations of England
Royal Navy squadrons
Military units and formations established in 1294